Sutorang is a 1964 Bengali-language film directed by Subhash Dutta. Dutta played the male lead role as well.
 Actress Kabori Sarwar made her debut in this film. The film won the second prize in Frankfurt Asia Film in 1964. 

Ferdausi Rahman sang the song titled "Poraney Dola Dilo Ekhon Bhromora", composed by Satya Saha and Aliya Sharafi sang "Emon Moja Hoi Na".

Film critic Ahmed Muztaba Zamal, when asked by Cinemaya in 2000 to name the top ten films from Bangladesh, named Sutorang, made when the country was still East Pakistan, as one of the top twelve.

References

External links
 

1964 films
Bengali-language Pakistani films
Films directed by Subhash Dutta
1960s Bengali-language films